The Civic Platform presidential primary, 2020 was the second presidential primary after the 2010 Civic Platform presidential primary. The primary was organized by the party following the decision by  Donald Tusk not to run for president again (he lost in a runoff to Lech Kaczyński in 2005) and then served as Prime Minister from 2007 to 2014 after which he resigned to become President of the European Council. Prior to his withdrawal, Tusk was thought to be the presumptive nominee.

The voting took place during a special conference on December 14.

Candidates

Results

475 electors cast their votes at the convention. 5 electors cast an empty ballot.

 Małgorzata Kidawa-Błońska: 73.4%
 Jacek Jaśkowiak: 26.6%

Aftermath
After being nominated, Małgorzata Kidawa-Błońska was seen as the main challenger to incumbent Andrzej Duda. However, her campaign failed to gain any traction and she ended up polling below all of the major candidates. Due to the COVID-19 outbreak, the original election was cancelled and the Civic Platform decided to replace her with Rafał Trzaskowski. Trzaskowski ended up losing the election in the second round to Duda.

See also
2020 Polish presidential election

References

External links
 https://www.politico.eu/article/donald-tusk-elected-president-of-european-peoples-party
  http://wiadomosci.gazeta.pl/wiadomosci/7,114884,25512314,znamy-kandydata-po-na-prezydenta-przeciwko-andrzejowi-dudzie.html

Primary elections in Poland
Civic Platform
2020 Polish presidential election
2019 elections in Poland